The Treaty of Accession 1979 was the agreement between the European Communities and Greece, concerning this country's accession into the EC. It entered into force on 1 January 1981. The Treaty arranged accession of Greece to the EC and amended earlier treaties of the European Communities. As such it is an integral part of the constitutional basis of the European Union.

Full title
The full official name of the treaty is:

See also
Enlargement of the European Union

References

1979 in the European Economic Community
Treaties of Accession to the European Union
Treaties entered into force in 1981
Treaties concluded in 1979
Treaties of Greece
1979 in Greece